S. L. Blackwell (born ca. 1833) was a California miner and Assemblyman (1875–76 and 1877–78) representing Nevada County. A native of North Carolina, he arrived in California via Tennessee in 1853, and resided at Moores Flat and Snow Point, while developing a gravel mine. A member of the Democratic Party, Blackwell served as chairman of the Assembly's Committee on Mines and Mining.

References

1830s births
Year of death missing
Members of the California State Assembly
People of the California Gold Rush
People from Nevada County, California